Bitter Funeral Beer is an album by Swedish ethnomusicologist, drummer, and composer Bengt Berger recorded in 1981 and released on the ECM label.

Reception
The Allmusic review by Brian Olewnick awarded the album 4½ stars stating "the combination of stunningly gorgeous repeating themes and inspired improvising make one wish the music would never stop. This recording, though little known, is one of the very finest items ever released by ECM. While wonderful in and of itself, it might also serve as a fine introduction to West African music, albeit via a circuitous route through Stockholm".

Track listing
All traditional compositions arranged by Bengt Berger
 "Bitter Funeral Beer" - 9:18 
 "Blekete" - 3:05 
 "Chetu" - 3:20 
 "Tongsi" - 5:03 
 "Darafo/Funeral Dance (Dar Kpee)" - 22:16
Recorded at Decibel Studios in Stockholm, Sweden in January 1981

Personnel
Bengt Berger - xylophone (ko-gyil - Lo Birifor funeral xylophone) 
Don Cherry - pocket trumpet 
Tord Bengtsson - violin, electric guitar
Jörgen Adolfsson - violin, sopranino saxophone, soprano saxophone, alto saxophone 
Tommy Adolfsson - trumpet
Christer Bothen - bass clarinet, tenor saxophone
Thomas Mera Gartz - violin, tenor saxophone, drums
Matthias Hellden - cello
Ulf Wallander - soprano saxophone, tenor saxophone; 
Kjell Westling - sopranino saxophone, bass clarinet
Sigge Krantz - electric guitar, bass
Bosse Skoglund - drums
Anita Livstrand - voice, bells, axatse (rattle)

References

ECM Records albums
1982 albums
Albums produced by Manfred Eicher